Junior Périclès Ngadja Nyabeyeu (born 16 June 1993) is a Cameroonian weightlifter, who competes in the 109 kg category and represents Cameroon at international competitions. In August 2022, he won gold at the 2022 Commonwealth Games.

References

External links 

Living people
1993 births
Cameroonian male weightlifters
Commonwealth Games gold medallists for Cameroon
Weightlifters at the 2022 Commonwealth Games
Commonwealth Games medallists in weightlifting
21st-century Cameroonian people
Medallists at the 2022 Commonwealth Games